Nong Quanfu (?-1039), also recorded as Nùng Tồn Phúc was a Nùng/Zhuang chieftain and zhou-level official of Guangyuan located in the modern-day Cao Bang in the 11th century AD. He was the father of the Nùng/Zhuang chieftain Nong Zhigao, who revolted against Annamese rule in 1048, established the Kingdom of Changsheng, and besieged Guangzhou for two months in 1052.

Biography
Nong Quanfu was a son of Nong Minfu, a local chieftain of Guangyuan. Nong Minfu received the titles minister of works (司空) and grand master of splendid happiness bearing the golden pocket with purple trimming (金紫光祿大夫) from the Song court, which he eventually passed on to his son, Nong Quanfu. Nong Quanfu was then granted the additional authority to rule Thang Do prefecture in the southeastern corner of the present-day Jingxi county, in Guangxi. His younger brother and brother-in-law controlled two other nearby prefectures. Quanfu's home prefecture was a great source of gold, which together with his domination over local trade route along the Bang river must have largely increased his wealth and political influence. Around 1020, Nong Quanfu married A Nong, a shamaness and the daughter of a noted chieftain of the Nong clan. Later, A Nong became his primary political advisor. Under A Nong's instruction, Quanfu killed his brother who was a leader in the Cen (岑) clan and took his land. Nung/Zhuang chieftains allocated lands to followers in a true feudal system, with some attributes of slave-holding practices. The amount of land controlled by a chieftain affected the number of men he could field, a powerful incentive to expansive warfare. The Nong clan eventually controlled 14 majors dongs, compared to 5 claimed by the Huang clan. Quanfu found the Kingdom of Longevity (長生國) and took for himself the exalted title Luminous and Sage Emperor (昭聖皇帝). He gave his wife A Nong the title Enlightened and Virtuous Empress (明德皇后). Quanfu then broke off all ties with Vietnamese ruler Lý Phật Mã, but was finally captured and executed by the Vietnamese ruler in 1039.

Notes

References
Citations

Works cited

 
 
 
 
 

1039 deaths
Zhuang people
People from Cao Bằng Province
People executed by Vietnam
Year of birth unknown
Founding monarchs
11th-century Tai people
Nùng people